Lorne is a community in the Canadian province of Nova Scotia, located in  Pictou County along Route 374.

Lorne was originally known as "Big Brook". Sir Simon Fraser, a future Australian senator, was born in the area. His grandson Malcolm Fraser became Prime Minister of Australia.

References

Communities in Pictou County
General Service Areas in Nova Scotia